The Bibliothèque municipale de Douai, now Bibliothèque Marceline Desbordes-Valmore (after the Douai-born poet Marceline Desbordes-Valmore) is a library in Douai, France. Founded in 1767, it was bombed on August 11, 1944. The library reopened in 1955, in a new building designed by the architect Maurice Coasnes.

The special collections ("réserve patrimoniale") include 607 medieval manuscripts (many of which were confiscated at the suppression of Anchin Abbey and Marchiennes Abbey during the French Revolution), over 300 incunables, a considerable number of works printed in Douai on hand-operated presses from 1569 onwards, and the literary remains (letters and manuscripts) of Marceline Desbordes-Valmore (1786-1859).

References

External links
La bibliothèque Marceline Desbordes-Valmore
Page on the library in Catalogue collectif de France (CCFr).

Public libraries in France
Buildings and structures in Douai
Education in Hauts-de-France
Libraries established in 1767
1767 establishments in France